

Chicks Beduino (1984–2003) as of the end of 2006 was second on the all-time list of leading Quarter Horse sires by races won by his offspring, and third on the all-time list of racing money earned by his offspring. He has sired one World Champion Quarter Running Horse – Whosleavingwho, as well as other champion horses including Separatist, Chicks First Policy, Corona Chick, This Snow is Royal, Artesias Special Chic, The Prize, Country Chics Man and Evening Snow. He died in 2003 from kidney failure.

Chicks Beduino was inducted into the AQHA Hall of Fame in 2007.

Pedigree

Notes

References

External links
 All Breed Pedigree Database of Chichs Beduino
 Chicks Beduino at Quarter Horse Directory
 Chicks Beduino at Quarter Horse Legends

American Quarter Horse racehorses
American Quarter Horse sires
1984 racehorse births
2003 racehorse deaths
AQHA Hall of Fame (horses)